The 2015–16 New Mexico State Aggies women's basketball team will represent New Mexico State University during the 2015–16 NCAA Division I women's basketball season. The Aggies, led by sixth year head coach Mark Trakh, play their home games at the Pan American Center and are members of the Western Athletic Conference. They finished the season 26–5, 13–1 in WAC play to win the regular season WAC championship. They defeated Utah Valley and Texas–Rio Grande Valley to be champions of the WAC women's tournament. They received an automatic bid to the NCAA tournament where they lost in the first round to Arizona State.

Roster

Schedule

|-
!colspan=9 style="background:#882345; color:#FFFFFF;"| Non-conference regular season

|-
!colspan=9 style="background:#882345; color:#FFFFFF;"| WAC regular season

|-
!colspan=9 style="background:#882345; color:#FFFFFF;"| WAC Women's Tournament

|-
!colspan=9 style="background:#882345; color:#FFFFFF;"| NCAA Women's Tournament

See also
2015–16 New Mexico State Aggies men's basketball team

References

New Mexico State Aggies women's basketball seasons
New Mexico State
New Mexico State
Aggies
Aggies